Jon Peter May (born September 16, 1939 in New York) is an American mathematician working in the fields of algebraic topology, category theory, homotopy theory, and the foundational aspects of spectra. He is known, in particular, for the May spectral sequence and for coining the term operad. The word "operad" was created by May as a portmanteau of "operations" and "monad" (and also because his mother was an opera singer).

Education and career
May received a Bachelor of Arts degree from Swarthmore College in 1960 and a Doctor of Philosophy degree from Princeton University in 1964. His thesis, written under the direction of John Moore, was titled The cohomology of restricted Lie algebras and of Hopf algebras: Application to the Steenrod algebra.

From 1964 to 1967, May taught at Yale University. He has been a faculty member at the University of Chicago since 1967, and a professor since 1970.

Awards
In 2012 he became a fellow of the American Mathematical Society.
He has advised over 60 doctoral students, including Mark Behrens, Andrew Blumberg, Frederick Cohen, Ib Madsen, Emily Riehl, Mike Shulman and Zhouli Xu.

References

External links
 May's homepage at the University of Chicago
 Jon Peter May at the Mathematics Genealogy Project

20th-century American mathematicians
21st-century American mathematicians
Topologists
University of Chicago faculty
Yale University faculty
Princeton University alumni
Swarthmore College alumni
Fellows of the American Mathematical Society
1939 births
Living people
Mathematicians from New York (state)